Tasnia Farin (born 30 January 1998) is a Bangladeshi actress and model. She rose to fame with her central role in the web series Ladies & Gentlemen directed by Mostofa Sarwar Farooki. The ZEE5 web series released on 9 July 2021. She is also known for her performance in the drama EX BOYFRIEND. She has also been seen in several dramas and music videos. She played the role of a katha in a web film Networker Baire directed by Mizanur Rahman Aryan and produced by Redwan Rony, which was released on August 19 of the same year. In 2022, Farin is starring in Indian bengali language film titled Aro Ek Prithibi directed by Kolkata-based filmmaker Atanu Ghosh. 

In 2022, she won the Channel I Digital Media Award for Best Actress in a Web Series and Best Emerging Female Actor for her performance in Ladies & Gentlemen. In the same year, she won the Meril-Prothom Alo Critics Award for Best Actress in a Limited Length Of Film for her performance in Tithir Osukh.

Career 
Farin made her small screen debut in 2017 with her performance in the drama Amra Abar Firbo Kobe. She started acting at the will of her mother. She worked with Mashrafe Mortaza in an advertisement for BKash in 2018. The drama X BOYFRIEND made her quite popular on Valentine's Day the same year. She appeared into various Bangladeshi Natoks. She was also seen in ZEE5's web series Ladies & Gentleman and Troll. She has acted in about eighty dramas in 2019.

She wanted to be a singer since childhood.

Dramas and telefilms

Drama series

Dramas and telefilms

Filmography

Music video

Awards and nominations

References

External links
 

1998 births
Living people
21st-century Bangladeshi actresses
Web series actresses
Bangladeshi models
Bangladesh University of Professionals alumni
Bangladeshi television actresses
Bangladeshi film actresses